Maya Kazan (born November 24, 1986) is an American actress. She is best known for her role as Eleanor Gallinger on the television series The Knick (2014–2015).

Personal life 
Kazan is the daughter of screenwriters Nicholas Kazan and Robin Swicord, and the granddaughter of film director Elia Kazan and playwright Molly Kazan. Her sister is actress Zoe Kazan.

Career

Theater 
In 2012, Kazan starred as Lucrece in Pierre Corneille's The Liar, written by David Ives at the Shakespeare Theatre of New Jersey.

In 2013, she played the role of Laura in Michael Rabe's play The Future Is Not What It Was at the Walkerspace theater in New York.

In 2014, she took on the role of the adult Perdita in William Shakespeare's The Winter's Tale at the Old Globe Theater. In a February 2014 Los Angeles Times review, critic Charles McNulty wrote: "Kazan doesn't yet possess a strong stage voice, but she has everything else that's needed to make us fall in love with Perdita — natural radiance, unassuming intelligence and gentleness."

Television 
In 2014, Kazan landed a recurring role as Eleanor Gallinger in Steven Soderbergh's The Knick on Cinemax alongside co-stars Clive Owen, Eve Hewson and Grainger Hines. That same year, she landed another recurring role on HBO's Boardwalk Empire playing Mabel Thompson, the wife of a young Nucky Thompson, in a string of flashbacks throughout the series' fifth and final season.

Filmography

References

External links 

 

1986 births
Living people
21st-century American actresses
Actresses from Los Angeles
American film actresses
American stage actresses
American television actresses
Wesleyan University alumni
Kazan family